Ribulose-phosphate 3-epimerase is an enzyme that in humans is encoded by the RPE gene.

References

Further reading